Soul Circle is an album by organist Jack McDuff recorded between 1964 and 1966 and released on the Prestige label.

Reception
Allmusic awarded the album 3 stars.

Track listing 
All compositions by Jack McDuff except as indicated
 "More" (Riz Ortolani, Nino Oliviero) - 6:28   
 "Lew's Piece" - 8:20   
 "You'd Be So Easy to Love" (Cole Porter) - 4:50   
 "That's When We Thought of Love" (Harold Ousley) - 4:22   
 "Opus de Funk" (Horace Silver) - 6:55

Personnel 
Jack McDuff - organ
Red Holloway (tracks 2 & 5), Harold Ousley (tracks 1 & 4), Harold Vick (track 3) - tenor saxophone 
George Benson (tracks 2 & 5), Pat Martino (track 1 & 4), Eddie Diehl (track 3) - guitar
Joe Dukes - drums

References 

Jack McDuff albums
1968 albums
Prestige Records albums